Kuhanjan (also Romanized as Kūhanjān) is a village in Shurab Rural District, in the Central District of Arsanjan County, Fars Province, Iran. At the 2006 census, its population was 809, in 179 families.  Its area code is 712526.

References 

Populated places in Arsanjan County